{{safesubst:#invoke:RfD|||month = March
|day = 10
|year = 2023
|time = 23:07
|timestamp = 20230310230741

|content=
REDIRECT Park Chung-hee

}}